Albino Pierro (19 November 1916 in Tursi – 23 March 1995 in Rome) was an Italian poet. He was famous for his works in Lucan dialect, and being nominated for the Nobel Prize for Literature.

Biography
He was born in Tursi in the province of Matera. He had a very troubled childhood, his mother dying prematurely.

As a teenager, after a period of frequent journeys to Taranto, Salerno, Sulmona, Udine and Novara, he settled in Rome in 1939. He graduated in 1944 in philosophy, and in 1946 began his career as a letter published in various collections in the language, until in 1959 with A land we remember which began its production in dialect Tourist Office. Since then he pulled away from the language of his native land, where the militant criticism reflected the deepest impressions of the Romance languages, thanks to phonic resources and symbolic idiom.

In 1976, he won the award Carducci for poetry. In 1986 and 1988, he was close to winning the Nobel Prize for Literature, was recognized as a great poet even abroad. In 1985 was invited by the University of Stockholm to a poetry reading. Received in 1992 honorary degree from University of Basilicata. In 1993 The Normale di Pisa school organized a meeting with the poet.

On 23 March 1996, exactly one year after his death, the City Council, proclaimed Tursi "City of Pierro" and named the schools, including kindergarten, elementary and Media, after him. To the City of Tursi has donated his house and the library containing thousands of books.

English language translations

Italian language works
 Liriche, Palatina, Roma 1946
 Nuove Liriche, Danesi in via Margutta, Roma 1949
 Mia madre passava, Fratelli Palombi, Roma 1956
 Il transito del vento, Dell'Arco, Roma 1957
 Poesie, Roma, 1958
 Il mio villaggio, Cappelli, Bologna 1959
 Agavi e Sassi, Dell'Arco, Roma 1960
 Appuntamento, Editori Laterza, Bari 1967
 Incontro a Tursi, Editori Laterza, Bari 1973

Works in the Lucan vernacular
 A terra d'u ricorde, Il Nuovo Belli, Roma 1960
 (FR) La terre du souvenir, translation Madeleine Santschi, Scheiwiller, Milano 1972.
 Metaponte, Il Nuovo Cracas, Roma 1960
 Metaponto, Editori Laterza, Bari 1966
 (FR) Metaponto, translation M. Santschi, Milano 1972
 Metaponto, Garzanti, Milano 1982
 (FR) Métaponte, translation Philippe Guérin, note di Gina Labriola, La Différence, [S. l.] 1996
 I'nnammurète, Editori Laterza, Bari 1963
 (FR) Les amoreaux, translation M. Sanschti, Milano 1971.
 Nd'u piccicarelle di Turse, Editori Laterza, Bari 1967
 Eccò 'a morte?, Editori Laterza, Bari 1969
 Famme dorme, Scheiwiller, Milano 1971
 (FR) Laisse-moi dormir, translation M. Sanschti e note d’Antonio Pizzuto, Milano 1977.
 Curtelle a lu sòue, Editori Laterza, Bari 1973
 (FR) Couteaux au soleil, translation M. Santschi, Milano 1977.
 Nu belle fatte, Mondadori, Milano 1975
 (EN) A beautiful Story, translation E. Farnsworth, introduzione di Gianfranco Folena, Milano 1976.
 (FR) Une belle histoire, translation M. Santschi, Scheiwiller, Milano 1977.
 Com'agghi 'a fe?, Edizioni 32, Milano 1977
 (FR) Comm’agghì‘a fè, translation M. Santschi, Milano 1975.
 Sti mascre, L'Arco Ed.d'Arte, Roma 1980
 Dieci poesie inedite in dialetto tursitano, Pacini, Lucca 1981
 Poesie inedite in omaggio a Pierro, Lacaita, Manduria 1982
 Ci uéra turnè, Ed.del Girasole, Ravenna 1982
 Si pò nu jurne, Gruppo Forma, Torino 1983
 Poesie tursitane, Ed.del Leone, Venezia 1985
 Tante ca pàrete notte, Manni, Galatina 1986
 Un pianto nascosto, Einaudi, Torino 1986
 Nun c'è pizze di munne, Mondadori, Milano 1992

Videography
 Documentary Albino Pierro. Investigation of a poet, created by Maria Luisa Forenza, which lasted 51 minutes, broadcast on RAI1 on 22 January 2007.

Critical Studies

References

External links

External links
 Mariagrazia Palumbo, biography pierriana
 Albino Pierro told by Antonio Lotierzo

1916 births
1995 deaths
People from the Province of Matera
Italian male poets
20th-century Italian poets
20th-century Italian male writers